The 1957 Campeonato Nacional de Fútbol Profesional, was the 25th season of top-flight football in Chile. Audax Italiano won their fourth title.

Scores

Standings

Relegation play-off

Topscorer

References

External links 
ANFP 
RSSSF Chile 1957

Primera División de Chile seasons
Primera
Chile